DTEK (Ukrainian: ДТЕК) is the largest private investor in the energy industry in Ukraine. The company's enterprises generate electricity at solar, wind and thermal power plants; extract coal and natural gas, trade energy products in the Ukrainian and foreign markets, distribute and supply electricity to consumers, and develop a grid of supercharger stations for e-vehicles.

The main office of the company is located in Kyiv. The company is owned by SCM Holdings, a company of a Ukrainian businessman, Rinat Akhmetov.

History

2005–2010 
DTEK  was established in 2005. The company includes Pavlohradvuhillia, Komsomolets Donbasu coal mine, Skhidenergo and Service-Invest.

In 2006, PEM—Energovugillia, Pavlohradska and Kurakhivska CEPs joined in, and in 2007, Dobropilska, Oktiabrska and Mospinska Coal Processing Enterprise.

In 2007, DTEK joined the UN Global Compact. A program to modernize all Skhidenergo power units has been launched, and the rating agencies Moody's and Fitch have assigned international credit ratings to the company for the first time.

In 2008, the Wind Power LLC company has been founded. Later, it became part of the operating company  DTEK RENEWABLES, which today manages all of DTEK's renewable energy assets.

In 2009, the company exported electricity to Hungary, Romania and Slovakia for the first time after obtaining the right to access international power grids at an auction.

In 2010, DTEK joined the European industry associations EURACOAL and EURELECTRIC.

2011–2016 
In 2011, the company became a member of CSR Europe. The same year, DTEK became the largest private shareholder in PJSC Kyivenergo. The State Property Fund and DTEK also entered into lease and concession agreements for the state enterprises Dobropilliavuhillia, Rovenkyantratsyt and Sverdlovantratsyt.  

In May 2011, DTEK Oil&Gas was established to develop projects in the oil and gas industry.

In 2012, the implementation of the first five-year stage of DTEK's long-term development strategy was completed. In 2008–2012, over $2.5 billion was invested in production. This year, the turbines of the first stage of the Botiyevska wind farm were launched. The first acquisition of coal assets outside Ukraine took place — DTEK included the Obukhivska Mine Administration, Donskoy antratsyt and Sulinantratsyt (Russia). In 2021, the information about the sale of assets to the Cyprus structure of Valleyton Investments Limited was made public.

In 2013, DTEK began supplying gas from Europe and acquired a stake in Naftogazvydobuvannia. The second issue of Eurobonds was placed at the amount of $750 million.

In 2014,  DTEK RENEWABLESumed power supply for 1.4 million residents in 600 settlements that were de-energized as a result of the hostilities in eastern Ukraine. DTEK also completed the process of reforming the business management system. The management company DTEK and three operating companies were established: DTEK Energy, which provides asset management in coal mining, thermal power generation and electricity distribution, DTEK VDE — in alternative energy, and DTEK Oil&Gas— in natural gas production. Then, the fourth operating company was established to provide comprehensive energy efficiency services — DTEK ESCO. The Botievska wind farm reached its design capacity, became the largest in Ukraine and entered the five largest wind farms in Central and Eastern Europe.

In 2015, Neftegazvydobuvannia put into operation the deepest gas well in Eastern Europe (6,750 m) and reached the highest rate for private gas production in Ukraine.

In 2016, Neftegazvydobuvannia produced 1.6 billion cubic meters of natural gas.

2017–2021 
In 2017, DTEK lost control over its enterprises located in certain areas of Donetsk and Luhansk regions. Among them: DTEK Mine Komsomolets Donbassa, Mospinska WFP, DTEK PEM—Energovugillia, DTEK Skhidenergo (OP Zuevska TPP), DTEK Donetskoblenergo, Tehrempostavka, DTEK Sverdlovantratsyt, DTEK Rovenkyantratsyt, Elektronaladka, DTEK High Voltage Grids and DTEK Service. In the same year, the first solar energy facility was commissioned — Tryfanivska SPP in the Kherson region. DTEK Prydniprovska TPP switched power units 7–8 from anthracite coal grades to gas-fired ones. DTEK Energy acquired LLC Corum Druzhkivska Machine-Building Plant, LLC ITC Mining Machines and 61.2% of the shares of PrJSC Svitlo Shakhtaria.

In 2018, as part of the electricity market reform, the company completed the unbundling procedure, as a result of which distribution system operators were created on the basis of Kyivenergo, Dniprooblenergo and Donetskoblenergo — DTEK Kyiv electrical grid, DTEK Dnipro electrical grid and DTEK Donetsk electrical grid ". Independently of them, three supplier companies started working: Kiev Energy Services, Dnipro Energy Services, Donetsk Energy Services. The strategic management of the established OSRs, as well as DTEK High Voltage Grids and DTEK PEM—Energovugillia, is carried out by the operating holding DTEK Grids. To coordinate the work of supplier companies, an independent operating holding D.Solutions (LLC "D.Solutions") was created. The company D.Trading (LLC "D.Trading") was also created, which is responsible for the development of wholesale trade in energy resources on the territory of Ukraine and on external energy markets. In addition,  DTEK RENEWABLES signed a contract with General Electric for the construction of two phases of the Prymorska wind farm, began construction of the Nikopolska SPP in partnership with the Chinese company SMES and the construction of the Orel wind farm in partnership with the Danish company Vestas.

Also in 2018, DTEK launched a grid of high-speed charging stations for electric vehicles STRUM, which was renamed YASNO E-mobility in 2019.

In 2019,  DTEK RENEWABLES began construction of the Pokrovska SPP. The controlling stakes in Odesaoblenergo and Kyivoblenergo were also acquired. In the same year, the company completed the construction of the Orlivska and Prymorska WPPs, Nikopolska and Pokrovska SPPs, and DTEK's portfolio of renewable energy projects reached 1 GW.

On September 18, 2020, at the request of Sberbank of Russia, the District Court of Amsterdam imposed a $45.1 million restriction on DTEK Energy B.V on certain of the company's assets in the Netherlands. Also in 2020, DTEK joined the new global Platform of the World Economic Forum to combat COVID-19. In addition,  DTEK RENEWABLES received the Green Bond Pioneer Award from the Climate Bond Initiative for its debut green bond issue.

In 2021,  DTEK RENEWABLES starts construction of the first stage of the Tyligulska wind farm in cooperation with the Danish company Vestas. Also in 2021, DTEK acquired 24.5% of Kirovogradoblenergo from VS Energy.

Operations 
In wind energy, DTEK Renewables is represented by the Botiyevska and Prymorska wind power plants and the Oryol wind farm with a capacity of 100 MW.

In 2017, a pilot project in solar energy was implemented — the construction of the Trifonivska SPP with a capacity of 10 MW; 2019 Nikopolska and Pokrovska solar power plants were commissioned with a total inverter capacity of 440 MW.

DTEK Energy provides a closed cycle for the production of electricity from coal. In coal mining, a full production cycle has been created: mining and enrichment of coal, service maintenance of mine equipment.

DTEK Oil & Gas is responsible for the oil and gas business in the structure of the DTEK energy holding. The main asset is Neftegazvydobuvannya, which produces gas and gas condensate in the Poltava region at the Semyrenkivska and Machukhska fields.

DTEK Grids develops a business for the distribution of electricity and operation of power grids in Kyiv, Dnipro, Donetsk and Odessa regions. Enterprises serve  as many 5.6 million customers.

The company provides strategic management of the distribution system operators created as a result of unbundling — DTEK Kyiv Grids, DTEK Dnipro Grids and DTEK Donetsk Grids, as well as DTEK High—Voltage Grids and DTEK PEM—Energovuhillia.

D.Solutions is responsible for retail electricity supply, energy efficiency services and electric vehicle charging. The company manages electricity supplier companies created as a result of unbundling: Kiev Energy Services, Dnipro Energy Services, Donetsk Energy Services, uniting their activities under the YASNO brand. D.Solutions also develops a grid of fast charging stations, YASNO E-mobility (previously the project was called STRUM).

As of 2017, DTEK had an installed capacity of 17,710 MW and generated 37.14 TWh of electricity.

Academy DTEK 
Academy DTEK is an open educational business platform. The project is a partner of Ukrainian and international business schools and organizations, in particular, INSEAD, IE Business School, Thunderbird, HRCI, Kyiv—Mohyla Business School, FUIB, Kyivstar, VISA, etc.

Energy transformation: decarbonization and European integration

DTEK 2030's new strategy 
In the New Strategy for 2030, DTEK is committed to transforming its business into a more environmentally friendly, efficient and technological business, which is guided by ESG principles. DTEK's goal is to achieve carbon neutrality by 2040. DTEK has also integrated 12 UN Sustainable Development Goals into its ESG strategy. In 2020, DTEK invested UAH 3 billion in sustainable development.

Innovation and digital transformation 
In 2018, the Innovation Directorate - DTEK Innovation was established, and in early 2019, DTEK launched a digital transformation program for the company called MODUS. One of the main projects of the Innovation Directorate in 2021 was the opening of the first in Ukraine industrial lithium-ion energy storage system (CHS) with a capacity of 1 MW and a capacity of 2.25 MWh.

The laying of underground Wi-Fi communication at the Jubilee mine (MODUS project) at a depth of 510 meters has entered the Book of Records of Ukraine as the first and deepest underground communication infrastructure in the country.

In early 2021, DTEK announced the creation of an investment hub for new Ukrainian energy in the United Kingdom.

Corporate social responsibility projects 
The following projects belong to corporate social compliance:

Community with their own hands — annual competition of projects for public organizations, bodies of self-organization of the population, associations of co-owners of flat buildings and initiative groups of activists aimed at solving local problems and transforming the public space of territorial communities. In 2021, the project "Community with their own hands" received the UN Global Compact Partnership for Sustainability Award 2020.

Energy efficient schools. Restart — this project aims to promote the idea of rational use of energy resources, education of environmental values, involvement of students and their parents, employees of educational institutions and volunteers in environmental activities.

"Come on, play!" — this is a joint project with Shakhtar Football Club, aimed at developing mass children's amateur football and promoting the ideas of inclusiveness and a healthy lifestyle.

Birds of Ukraine — In 2021, DTEK Network launched the #Lelechenky  project, which became the largest environmental and educational project for the protection of birds in Ukraine. The company installed a record number of special protection platforms for stork nests in Ukraine - 122, in one month (September - October 2021), as a result about 600 storks were protected. Also within the project, 2 sculptures of the stork family were installed in Kyiv and Odessa. In addition, in 2021, DTEK Network's energy companies installed 2,372 bird protection devices on power lines (hoods and reflective markers).

DTEK during the Russian invasion of Ukraine in 2022

Stop Bloody Energy 
Since the very beginning of the 2022 Russian invasion, the DTEK Group together with NJSC Naftogaz and Ukrenergo initiated the Stop Bloody Energy project, within which they call on Western companies to stop cooperation with Russia in the energy sector. With the help of this initiative, Ukrainian companies want to show the international community that representatives of global business still continue to work with Russia, despite the war in Ukraine. The project website contains information about gas, coal trading, oil service and machine-building companies.

The initiative was publicly supported by the Office of the President of Ukraine, the President of Ukraine, Volodymyr Zelenskyi, the Minister of Foreign Affairs of Ukraine Dmytro Kuleba, the adviser to the head of the Office of the President of Ukraine Mykhailo Podolyak, the ambassador of Ukraine to Germany Andriy Melnyk, as well as famous Ukrainian football players, TV presenters and artists.

The Japanese company Komatsu, one of the world's largest manufacturers of special equipment, stopped working with Russia after the company was put on the Stop Bloody Energy list.

As part of the Stop Bloody Energy initiative, at the beginning of May 2022, more than 100 Ukrainians gathered near the head office of the French company Engie with the demand to terminate gas contracts with Russia.

Also, activists from Ukraine and Europe within the framework of the Stop Bloody Energy initiative held a protest in Davos during the World Economic Forum against the energy business that continues to operate in the Russian Federation.

Restoration of the energy infrastructure during the war 
Since the first day of Russia's full-scale invasion of Ukraine, DTEK has been repairing networks destroyed by shelling, and keeps working on restoring the electricity supply. On May 18, DTEK specialists returned 100% electricity to the Kyiv region, which was liberated from the Russian military on April 2, 2022. Electricity was supplied to the homes of 260,000 families in 600 settlements through high-voltage and distribution networks owned by the company.

DTEK Group invested UAH 300 million in the restoration of war-ravaged electrical networks of the Kyiv region. DTEK involved its specialists from Odesa and Dnipropetrovsk regions in order to restore the power supply of the Kyiv region. In total, 1,000 energy workers from different parts of the country worked on restoring the electricity.

DTEK energy workers restore electricity supply in the Donetsk region every day, despite constant hostilities. In general, as of June 2022, electricity has been restored in more than 2.8 million homes throughout Ukraine. The all-Ukrainian program for repairing networks and restoring energy infrastructure during the war was called "We are returning the light".

Heroes of the energy front 
In order to maintain the power system and restore the energy infrastructure, DTEK energy workers and miners work in extremely dangerous conditions - in the zone of active hostilities, often under fire - to restore electricity supply to the population and extract coal for the country.

Since February 24, 2022, 51 DTEK Group employees have died, and 99 people have been injured. To honor the heroic work of energy workers who risk their lives every day, DTEK Group initiated the "Heroes of the Energy Front" project. The project's website collects stories of energy workers who continue to work heroically in wartime conditions.

Ukrenergo, Centerenergo and Ukrzaliznytsia also joined the initiative. In March 2022, Prime Minister Denys Shmyhal awarded awards to energy workers who have been working on the front lines since the beginning of the Russian invasion. Workers who, from the first day of the war, carried out the restoration of transmission system facilities near Vasylkiv, Hostomel, and Novi Petrivtsi — the hottest spots in the Kyiv region — were honored with awards.

Also in May 2022, the Cabinet of Ministers awarded DTEK energy workers working in combat conditions with an honorary certificate "For Courage". Energy workers of DTEK Donetsk power grids were awarded certificates of honor of the Cabinet of Ministers for personal courage and selfless actions during emergency restoration work on electric power transmission lines that were damaged as a result of hostilities in Donbas, and rescuing people during the war.

Humanitarian aid and support of the Armed Forces 
Since the beginning of Russia's full-scale invasion of Ukraine, DTEK Group has been purchasing protective equipment for the military, medicines and grocery kits for Ukrainians, as well as supporting internally displaced persons.

As of June 2022, DTEK Group has sent more than 500 million hryvnias to support the Armed Forces of Ukraine, territorial defense forces and humanitarian aid.

The company provided more than 50,000 liters of fuel and 450 tons of coal for evacuation trains, more than 20,000 units of medicines to the Armed Forces and communities. Batches of portable radios and communication systems, batches of tourniquet harnesses, generators and drones were purchased and transferred.

The DTEK company ensured the evacuation of about 5,000 of its employees and their family members from combat zones.

In total, during the full-scale war, the company transferred 158 vehicles from its own fleet, including SUVs and mini-buses, which are used for public defense tasks.

Free electricity for hospitals and the military 
Since the beginning of Russia's full-scale invasion of Ukraine, DTEK Group has been providing free electricity to critical infrastructure institutions, state and communal medical institutions, military and law enforcement agencies. In four months, the DTEK Group provided free electricity worth UAH 160 million to about 100 establishments. In particular: Institute of Traumatology and Orthopedics of the Medical Academy of Ukraine, Dnipropetrovsk Regional Clinical Hospital named after I.I. Mechnikov, Dnipropetrovsk Regional Center of Emergency Medicine and Disaster Medicine, Kurakhiv City Hospital, etc.

Position of the company's shareholder

Assessment of Russia's actions 
In an interview with Radio Svoboda in March 2022, Akhmetov said that the worst thing in Russia's war against Ukraine is that civilians are suffering and dying. And Russia's military aggression is a war crime and a crime against humanity against Ukraine and Ukrainians.

Asked by the Ekonomichna Pravda about Putin and Russia, Akhmetov said that "Russia is an aggressor and Putin is a war criminal. It’s because Ukraine has always been a peaceful country, and has never attacked anyone."

In an interview with Forbes in March 2022 Akhmetov commented concerning Russian invasion of Ukraine: “What is unfolding here is a war crime and a crime against humanity, against Ukraine and the Ukrainians. This can neither be explained nor justified."

Vision of victory for Ukraine 
In an interview with Forbes Ukraine, Akhmetov noted that the victory for Ukraine is "a complete ceasefire, the withdrawal of Russian soldiers from Ukraine and a full restoration of Ukraine's internationally recognized borders. Including Donbass and Crimea."

Plans on recovery of Ukraine 
In a comment to Radio Svoboda, Akhmetov said he is confident that the time would come when Ukrainians would rebuild Ukraine, and stressed that he would personally invest all his strength and resources to restore Ukraine and become a prosperous country.

Recognition 
DTEK RENEWABLES is one of the largest investors in Ukraine's renewable energy sector. Since its inception, DTEK has invested $1.2 billion in the construction of wind farms and solar power plants. 

In 2014, the company built the 200 MW Botivska wind power plant, Ukraine's largest onshore wind power plant. 

In 2019, the company put into operation Pokrovska solar power station—the largest in Ukraine and the second largest in Europe.

In 2020 the company invested UAH 3.2 billion in sustainable development. 

In 2021, DTEK Oil&Gas drilled the deepest production well in Europe (6,750 m).

References

External links
 

SCM Holdings
Coal companies of Ukraine
Electric power companies of Ukraine
Oil companies of Ukraine
Companies based in Donetsk
Holding companies of Ukraine
Ukrainian companies established in 2002